Asthma & Allergy Friendly is a registered certification mark operated by Allergy Standards Limited in association with not-for-profit asthma and/or allergy organizations. They specialise in labelling products which have been put through and have passed standardised testing. 
The Asthma & Allergy Friendly Certification Program was created to scientifically test and identify consumer products that are more suitable for people with asthma and allergies.

Background
The avoidance of asthma triggers and/or allergens has been recognised by many clinicians and researchers as being an integral part of an asthma management plan. Although there has been some discussion as to whether dust mite avoidance measures will result in a clinically relevant outcome the resulting debate has given rise to a recommendation by the National Heart, Lung and Blood Institute that an asthma management plan should include avoidance of as many allergens as possible to which the individual is sensitive. This report and others also assert that no single specific measure is sufficient to reduce allergens: An allergen reduction plan, which encompasses a variety of approaches is necessary to address management of asthma symptoms.

Certification mark
Asthma & Allergy Friendly is a registered certification mark operated by Allergy Standards Limited in association with not-for-profit asthma and/or allergy organizations in the country of operation. Products are subjected to standardised testing and if they pass, are deemed Asthma & Allergy Friendly. The Asthma & Allergy Friendly Certification Program has been implemented in a number of countries, such as: 
 The United States (in association with the Asthma and Allergy Foundation of America), 

 Canada (in association with Asthma Canada)

 Internationally (operated by Allergy Standards)

The allergen immunoassay sampling and analysis for the certification program is carried out by various accredited partner laboratories such as Berkeley Analytical, Testex and Airmid Healthgroup specialised in environmental testings and in particular for allergy and asthma, microbiology, molecular biology, and aerobiology. Testing is conducted at a uniquely integrated testing facility which combines molecular biology, Enzyme-linked immunosorbent assay (ELISA) with state of the art air sampling and particle counting in a highly sophisticated environmental test chamber facility with a microbiological aerosol capability.

Certification process

Overview of the standards 
Standards assess products for the presence of allergenic dyes and sensitizing chemicals  as well as the capacity for allergen retention and ability to withstand eradication techniques such as repeated washing machine cycles. Product areas that have been certified include textile materials, electrical appliances, building products and kids toys.

Prerequisites 
Products seeking to be certified asthma & allergy friendly must pass Allergy Standards rigorous testing standards.  Manufacturers must submit their products for testing to Allergy Standards Ltd approved third party laboratories. Products must be submitted from current production and consumer ready. In order to pass the standards, products must meet the criteria of the standard relevant to the product category.

Laboratory tests 
Certification standards are tailored to the specific product categories. Criteria in the standards may include low or no Volatile Organic Compounds (VOC) emissions, free from banned dyes and allergens according to best international practice, and capable of either providing a barrier to allergens or effectively removing allergen from the environment. Importantly, products must also demonstrate that they are capable of carrying out their function effectively and are of acceptable quality and construction. For example textiles must be evaluated for barrier function, but must also demonstrate barrier function after washing.  Vacuum cleaners must demonstrate effective allergen removal, but this is also assessed when the bag is near capacity, demonstrating no significant loss of power and no redistribution of dust and allergens.

Allergy Standards Limited
Allergy Standards Limited is an International Standards and Certification Body that prepares independent standards for a wide range of products to declare their suitability for people whose lives are affected by allergies and asthma. Their headquarters are based in Dublin, Ireland. 

Allergy Standards published a white paper on Allergens and Irritants in Household Cleaning Products in the Household and Personal Care Today peer reviewed journal

References and notes

Allergology
Asthma
Certification marks
Product certification